The 1973–74 Memphis Tams season was the 2nd and final season of the Tams and 4th overall season of American Basketball Association basketball in Memphis. After the previous season had mercifully ended, doubt was put into if the Tams would stay in Memphis, as the phone lines and team office were closed. Charlie Finley tried to sell the team, with a Rhode Island group in discussion with Finley, but nothing came of it, with Finley subsequently dealing with a heart ailment for most of the summer, which rose a problem for the ABA, particularly with making schedules for the teams. The league's attempts to reach Finley came in late August, with the schedules for the league being released on August 25 - just over a month before the season was due to start. The Tams hired Butch Van Breda Kolff to coach on September 11, two days before the Tams' first pre-season game. The team floundered, losing 63 games. They finished 9th in points scored per game, at 101.2, while finishing 8th in points allowed at 108.2 per game. At one point in the season (November 29-December 21), they lost 13 straight games, with a 12-game losing streak occurring later in the year. Their best winning streak was 2, which they did four times. After the season, the league took over operations of the team. On July 17, 1974, Mike Storen, Issac Hayes, Avron Fogelman, and Kemmonis Wilson bought the team, rebranding the team as the Memphis Sounds.

Roster   
 33 Jim Ard - Center
 15 Johnny Baum - Small forward
 20 Glen Combs - Point guard
 34 Lee Davis - Center
 32 Randy Denton - Center
 30 Charles Edge - Small forward
 21 Larry Finch - Shooting guard
 25 Mike Jackson - Power forward
 11 Wil Jones - Power forward
 24 Mo Layton - Point guard
 24 George Lehmann  - Point guard
 35 Erwin Mueller - Power forward
 14 Johnny Neumann - Small forward
 25 Joe Reaves - Small forward
 35 Ronnie Robinson - Power forward
 10 Wilbert Robinson - Shooting guard
 23 George Thompson - Shooting guard
 20 Joby Wright - Power forward

Final standings

Eastern Division

Awards and honors
1974 ABA All-Star Game selection (game played on January 30, 1974)
George Thompson

References

External links
 RememberTheABA.com 1973–74 regular season and playoff results
 Memphis Tams page

Memphis Tams
Memphis Tams, 1973-74
Memphis Tams, 1973-74
Basketball in Memphis, Tennessee